Gavin Murray (born 4 August 1957) is a Scottish football player and manager. Murray played for Scottish Football League clubs Clydebank, Stenhousemuir and East Fife in the 1970s and 1980s. He then managed East Fife between 1987 and 1993.

References

External links

1957 births
Living people
Scottish footballers
Association football forwards
Clydebank F.C. (1965) players
Kirkintilloch Rob Roy F.C. players
Stenhousemuir F.C. players
East Fife F.C. players
Scottish Football League players
Scottish football managers
East Fife F.C. managers
Scottish Football League managers
Scottish Junior Football Association players
Footballers from Dunfermline